Acestrorhynchus pantaneiro, known commonly as the pike characin, is a species of fish in the family Acestrorhynchidae. It was described by Naércio Aquino de Menezes in 1992. It inhabits the La Plata, Paraná, Paraguay, Uruguay, and Mamoré Rivers.

A. pantaneiro feeds on bony fish. It is harvested by commercial fisheries.

References

Acestrorhynchidae
Taxa named by Naércio Aquino de Menezes
Fish described in 1992